Hench is a surname of possible English or Scottish origin. Notable people with the surname include:

Else Hench, Austrian luger
John Hench (1908–2004), American employee of The Walt Disney Company
 Julie Diana Hench, American ballet dancer, ballet master, writer and arts administrator
Kevin Hench, American screenwriter, producer, and columnist
Philip Showalter Hench (1896–1965), American physician

See also
Henchman
Henchmen (film)